For the purposes of parading, the Unit and Formation Regimental Colours of the Singapore Armed Forces (SAF) are arranged according to an order of protocol. This is the order in which the 37 Regimental Colours of the Singapore Armed Forces parade. The oldest Colours is placed on the left of the observer, and the sequence follows, with the youngest Colours taking the last position on the right. There are exceptions to this rule in the Singapore context, such as the placement of the Regimental Colours of the Commandos. SAFTI MI and Commandos Regimental Colours do not observe the order-by-date-of grant arrangement. These Colours precede the SAF's first Regimental Colours (1SIR - 27 July 1961), despite being granted on a later date.

In Air Force and Navy parades, the respective Regimental Colours of these two services will be paraded in a similar order as listed below excluding those of the Army and joint-service units/formations.

 SAFTI Military Institute
 Headquarters, Commandos
 1st Commando Battalion
 1st Battalion, Singapore Infantry Regiment
 2nd Battalion, Singapore Infantry Regiment
 3rd Battalion, Singapore Infantry Regiment
 5th Battalion, Singapore Infantry Regiment
 6th Battalion, Singapore Infantry Regiment
 1st Battalion, Singapore Guards
 3rd Battalion, Singapore Guards
 40th Battalion, Singapore Armoured Regiment
 41st Battalion, Singapore Armoured Regiment
 42nd Battalion, Singapore Armoured Regiment
 48th Battalion, Singapore Armoured Regiment
 Headquarters, Singapore Artillery
 Headquarters, Singapore Combat Engineers
 Headquarters, Signals
 Headquarters, Maintenance and Engineering Support
 Singapore Armed Forces Military Police Command
 Headquarters, Intelligence
 8th Battalion, Singapore Infantry Regiment
 9th Battalion, Singapore Infantry Regiment
 Headquarters, Singapore Armed Forces Ammunition Command
 Headquarters, Supply
 Headquarters, Transport
 Army Deployment Force
 RSN Headquarters Fleet
 RSN Naval Logistics Command
 RSN Naval Diving Unit
 RSN  Maritime Security Task Force
 RSAF Air Defence Operations Command
 RSAF Air Combat Command
 RSAF Participation Command
 RSAF Air Power Generation Command
 RSAF Unmanned Aerial Vehicle Command
 Headquarters, Medical Corps
 Imagery Support Group

References
 Singapore Armed Forces, "Our Army: Customs and Traditions", 2006.
 "National Day Parade 2012: Trainer's Handbook", 2012

Military of Singapore